Spyros Livathinos (born 8 January 1955) is a former football player who played as a midfielder, coach and current scout of Panathinaikos.

Career
Born in Patras, Livathinos started his football career in the Panathinaikos youth system. In 1975, he made it to the greens' first team where he played a total of 267 league games in 10 seasons, winning three Alpha Ethniki and four Greek Football Cup titles. Livathinos then moved on to Cyprus where he became player/coach of Pezoporikos. In 1988, he led the Larnaca club to the championship of Cyprus and retired as a player.

Livathinos made 27 appearances and scored one goal for the Greece national football team.

He continued his coaching career guiding Ethnikos Asteras to the championship of the Greek B Division. He continued to coach the Kaisariani club in the A Division from 1999 until 2001. In 2002, he coached Panachaiki for the early part of the season and Ethnikos Asteras in the latter part, replacing Nikos Alefantos. Livathinos currently is scout of Panathinaikos.

References

External links

1955 births
Living people
Greek football managers
Greek footballers
Greece international footballers
Panathinaikos F.C. players
UEFA Euro 1980 players
Expatriate footballers in Cyprus
Super League Greece players
Cypriot First Division players
Panachaiki F.C. managers
Footballers from Patras
Pezoporikos Larnaca players
Pezoporikos Larnaca managers
Association football midfielders